Everittstown (also known as Everitts Town) is an unincorporated community located within Alexandria Township, in Hunterdon County, New Jersey, United States. The Everittstown Historic District was listed on the National Register of Historic Places in 1980.

Historic district

The Everittstown Historic District is a historic district encompassing the village. The district is located at intersection of County Route 513, County Route 519 and Palmyra Road. It was added to the National Register of Historic Places on August 28, 1980 for its significance in architecture, commerce, and industry. The Baltus Pickel house was built  with vernacular Italianate style.

References

External links
 
 

Alexandria Township, New Jersey
Unincorporated communities in Hunterdon County, New Jersey
Unincorporated communities in New Jersey
National Register of Historic Places in Hunterdon County, New Jersey
Historic districts on the National Register of Historic Places in New Jersey
New Jersey Register of Historic Places
Italianate architecture in New Jersey